Savernake may refer to:

 Savernake, New South Wales, Australia
 Savernake Station, a farm
 Savernake, Wiltshire, a civil parish in England
 Savernake Forest, a privately owned forest, Wiltshire, England
 Savernake Low Level railway station, a closed station on the Great Western Railway between Bedwyn and Pewsey, England
 Savernake High Level railway station, former station (south of Marlborough) on the closed Midland and South Western Junction Railway, England
 Savernake (Holcombe) mansion, listed among Parktown mansions in Johannesburg, South Africa
 Viscount Savernake, title held by the heir to the Marquess of Ailesbury, United Kingdom